St Mary's College,(known colloquially as Marys), is an Australian Catholic secondary school for girls, located in Ipswich, Queensland, Australia.
The school accepts girl students from year 7 to year 12, drawing from a wide area of Ipswich, Queensland. The total enrolment is approximately 650. The school is a member of the Catholic Secondary Schoolgirls' Sports Association.

St Mary's School was established by Sisters of Mercy in 1863 as part of St Mary's Parish for the parish's primary-aged  children. In 1913, St Mary's College was established as a separate secondary school exclusively for the higher education of girls in the Mercy tradition. The College and its pupils were now distinct from the Primary School students. The Sisters of Mercy ceased administering and teaching at  the school in the early 1990s. The college is owned by the Parish and is now administered and staffed by Brisbane Catholic Education.

Musical and drama productions 
Each year, since 2007, a full musical production is conducted, in conjunction with St Edmund's College, Ipswich. The host school alternates every year.

Musicals 
 2022 (SMC) - ‘High School Musical - on Stage’
 2021 (SEC) - 'School of Rock' 
 2019 (SMC) - 'Matilda the musical' 
 2018 (SEC) - 'Rock of Ages 101: High School Edition' 
 2017 (SMC) - 'Hairspray' 
 2016 (SEC) - 'The Wiz' 
 2015 (SMC) - 'Legally Blonde: The Musical' 
 2014 (SEC) - 'West Side Story' 
 2013 (SMC) - 'The Bells of St Mary's' 
 2012 (SEC) - '13'
 2011 (SMC) - 'Fame'
 2010 (SEC) - 'Footloose'
 2009 (SMC) - 'High School Musical'
 2008 (SEC) - 'Grease'
 2007 (SMC) - 'Thoroughly Modern Millie'
 1993 (SEC) - 'Half a Sixpence'
 1992 (SEC) - 'The Pirates of Penzance'
 1991 (SEC) - '¡Viva México! (El grito de Dolores)'
 1990 (SEC) - 'Pippin'
 1989 (SEC) - 'Oklahoma'

Students also participate and perform at various musical and drama evenings and lunch-time theatre and theatre sports groups.

School Houses 
St Mary's College has four houses: Gorry, Horan, Murphy and Whitty.

Houses

Notable alumni
 Annastacia Palaszczuk second Queensland female premier (2015–Present)
 Leah Neale Australia swimming silver medal Olympian (2016)
 Jessie Christiansen NASA astrophysicist
- Rihanna - singer and song writer Rihanna

References

External links
  Official website

Education in Ipswich, Queensland
Girls' schools in Queensland
Catholic secondary schools in Queensland
Educational institutions established in 1863
Alliance of Girls' Schools Australasia
1863 establishments in Australia